Algis Uždavinys (1962–2010) was a prolific Lithuanian philosopher and scholar. His work pioneered the hermeneutical comparative study of Egyptian and Greek religions, especially their esoteric relations to Semitic religions, and in particular the inner aspect of Islam (Sufism). His books have been published in Lithuanian, Russian, English and French, including translations of Plotinus, Frithjof Schuon and Ananda Coomaraswamy into Russian and Lithuanian.

Early life
Brought up in Druskininkai, by the Nemunas River in southern Lithuania, Uždavinys moved to Vilnius to pursue studies at the former State Art Institute of Lithuania, now Vilnius Academy of Fine Arts.

Career
Upon graduation he came in contact with the writings and authors of the Traditionalist or Perennialist school, and this influenced his comparative exegesis, notably his studies on Sufism, the Ancient Egyptian religion, and his assertion of the substantial continuity of Greek philosophical tradition from Pythagoras down to the latest Neoplatonic authors. In this last claim he was expressly indebted to Pierre Hadot.

Uždavinys was an active member of the editorial board of the journal Acta Orientalia Vilnensia and head of the Department of Humanities at the Vilnius Academy of Fine Arts, Kaunas Faculty; as an art critic, philosopher and intellectual he was a prominent figure in Lithuanian cultural life. In 2008 he spent time as a research fellow at La Trobe University in Bendigo, Australia.

He was a member of the International Society for Neoplatonic Studies and The Lithuanian Artists' Association, and a regular contributor to journals such as Sacred Web, Vancouver, and Sophia, Washington DC.

Death
Uždavinys died in his sleep of an apparent heart attack on 25 July 2010 in his native village of Kabeliai.

Works

Books
The Golden Chain: An Anthology of Platonic and Pythagorean Philosophy (World Wisdom, 2004) . Introduction.
Philosophy as a Rite of Rebirth: From Ancient Egypt to Neoplatonism (The Matheson Trust and Prometheus Trust, 2008) . A free sizeable excerpt.
The Heart of Plotinus: The Essential Enneads (World Wisdom, 2009) .
Philosophy and Theurgy in Late Antiquity (Sophia Perennis, 2010) Ascent to Heaven in Islamic and Jewish Mysticism (The Matheson Trust, 2011) . PDF excerptOrpheus and the Roots of Platonism (The Matheson Trust, 2011) . PDF excerpt

Academic Monographs in LithuanianLabyrinth of Sources. Hermeneutical Philosophy and Mystagogy of Proclus, Vilnius: Lithuanian State Institute of Philosophy and Sociology, Eurigmas, 2002..Hellenic Philosophy from Numenius to Syrianus, Vilnius: Lithuanian State Institute of Culture, Philosophy, and Arts, 2003..The Egyptian Book of the Dead, Kaunas: Ramduva..Hermes Trismegistus: The Way of Wisdom, Vilnius: Sophia, 2005..

Chapters
"From Homer to the Glorious Qur’an: Hermeneutical Strategies in the Hellenistic and Islamic Traditions," Sacred Web, vol. 11, 2003.
"The Egyptian Book of the Dead and Neoplatonic Philosophy," History of Platonism, Plato Redivivus, eds. Robert Berchman and John Finamore. New Orleans: University Press of the South, 2005.
"Chaldean Divination and the Ascent to Heaven," in Seeing with Different Eyes: Essays in Astrology and Divination, eds. Patrick Curry and Angela Voss, Cambridge: Cambridge Scholars Publishing, 2007.

Articles
"Putting on the Form of the Gods: Sacramental Theurgy in Neoplatonism", Sacred Web vol. 5, 2000, pp.107-120.
"Sufism in the Light of Orientalism", Research Institute of Culture, Philosophy, and Arts, 2007.
"Voices of Fire: Understanding Theurgy", Eye of the Heart, Vol 1, 2008.
"Metaphysical symbols and their function in theurgy", Eye of the Heart, Vol 2, 2008.

See also
Perennial philosophy
Frithjof Schuon
Titus Burckhardt
Martin Lings
Seyyed Hossein Nasr
Peter Kingsley

References

External links
Kazimieras Seibutis, "In memoriam Algis Uždavinys", Acta Orientalia Vilnensia'' 9.2: 185–187.
World Wisdom author bio
La Trobe University staff information

1962 births
2010 deaths
Classical philologists
Comparative religion
Academic staff of the Vilnius Academy of Arts
20th-century Lithuanian philosophers
Traditionalist School
Lithuanian scholars of ancient Greek philosophy
21st-century Lithuanian philosophers
People from Druskininkai
Vilnius Academy of Arts alumni